Fall River Football Club, was the name used by a United States soccer clubs, based in Fall River, Massachusetts. They played in the American Soccer League during the 1932 season. The name is often used and is not to be confused with the Fall River F.C. team owned by Sam Mark aka the Marksmen.

Fall River F.C. II
This Fall River F.C. team played during the Fall 1932 American Soccer League season. The exact origins of this team are unclear. New Bedford Whalers, the successor team of both the earlier Fall River F.C./Providence Clamdiggers and the Marksmen, also began the Fall 1932 season but they only survived for six games before folding.  However one of their former players, Billy Gonsalves finished the season at the new Fall River club, scoring 7 goals in 12 games, as he helped them win the league title.

Notable players

Year-by-year

Honors

Fall River F.C. II

American Soccer League
Winners  Fall 1932:  1

References

Soccer clubs in Fall River, Massachusetts
Defunct soccer clubs in Massachusetts
American Soccer League (1921–1933) teams